Task Force Scorpio was a United Nations biological and chemical weapons response team that was activated during the first Gulf War to respond to any reported use of weapons of mass destruction on civilians. The task force was composed of volunteer Swiss members of the Disaster Relief Unit and international specialists, equipped with the latest chemical and biological protection equipment, immunized against agents suspected for battlefield use and had its own jet transportation.  The members of the team were to travel under Swiss diplomatic passports anywhere in the world in less than 24 hours of need.

The task of the force was to arrive on reportedly contaminated land, assess the risk to the civilian population, respond to it and coordinate the response by other international relief agencies, telling them when it would be safe to send in their personnel. Task Force Scorpio was under the orders of the Secretary-General of the United Nations, and was ready for active duty on the 28 February 1991, in time for the first Gulf War. It was not deployed. The Task force was founded by Dr Robert Steffen of the Institute of Social and Preventive Medicine, University of Zurich, Switzerland and co-founded by Jack Woodall, PhD, then at WHO/Geneva and leader of the WHO delegation to the Biological Weapons Convention.

Re-activation
The Task force was deactivated after the first Gulf War.  But the World Health Organization approached the Swiss government to reactivate it in January 2003. It was to be renamed the Swiss/European WMD Task Force. No information has been published about its reactivation.

In February 2016, the European Union launched a similar medical corps to respond to emergencies like the Ebola outbreak in West Africa. The response to that outbreak was slower and less organized than it might have been had a quick response force been available.

References

Sources

 

Gulf War